Ana Martinez de Luco (b. 1960–61) is a nun and founder of the recycling center Sure We Can. Sure We Can is New York City's only non-profit redemption center.

Ana de Luco's goals include creating respectable jobs for the canners, who include immigrants, disabled, elderly, poor, and homeless people.

Early life 
De Luco was born in Basque Country.

Life of service 
Ana de Luco became a nun at age 19. She leads workshops, teaching people about workers cooperatives. Her religious affiliation is with Sisters for Christian Community.

Ana de Luco moved to New York City in 2004 and founded Sure We Can in 2007.

In 2016, Ana resigned from her lead management position at Sure We Can.

References

Further consideration

Appearances on CUNY TV

Living people
Basque women
Recycling in New York City
Sustainability advocates
American environmentalists
Green thinkers
Women environmentalists
American women environmentalists
20th-century American Roman Catholic nuns
21st-century American Roman Catholic nuns
Year of birth missing (living people)
Urban farmers